The National Economic Council (NEC) is the principal forum used by the president of the United States for the consideration of domestic and international economic policy matters with senior policymaking and Cabinet officials, and forms part of the Office of Policy Development which is within the Executive Office of the President of the United States.  

Since the creation of the National Economic Council on January 25, 1993, its purpose is to coordinate domestic and international economic policy-making decisions; to advise the president on economic policy, with respect to domestic and international economic policy matters; to coordinate with various agencies across the federal government to establish consistent policy with the president's stated goals; and monitor the implementation of the economic agenda of the president. 

The National Economic Council differs from the Domestic Policy Council, as it considers economic policy matters, while the Domestic Policy Council may consider anything which is related to domestic matters, with the exception of economic policy matters. It also differs from the Council of Economic Advisers, which provides research for the White House based on data, research, and evidence. The Council is also the principal arm of the president when coordinating his economic policies and goals among various other agencies.

The National Economic Council is headed by the Assistant to the President for Economic Policy and Director of the National Economic Council. Since February 21, 2023, that position has been held by Lael Brainard.

History and mission
The National Economic Council was created on January 25, 1993 by Executive Order 12835 by President Bill Clinton, officially to coordinate the economic policy-making process with respect to domestic and international economic issues; to coordinate economic policy advice to the President; to ensure that economic policy decisions and programs are consistent with the President's stated goals, and to ensure that those goals are being effectively pursued; and to monitor implementation of the President's economic policy agenda. Clinton appointed Robert Rubin as Assistant to the President for Economic Policy and Director of the National Economic Council on January 25, 1993, the same day as the creation of the Council. The creation of the council also fulfilled a major promise by President Bill Clinton, to make the economy of the United States a priority.

Prior to the creation of the National Economic Council, economic policy staff had existed since the 1960's. President Lyndon B. Johnson assigned a senior aide to develop and organize domestic policy, of which economic policy was included. In 1970, President Richard M. Nixon issued an executive order which created the Office of Policy Development. President Clinton split the responsibilities of the Domestic Policy Council with the National Economic Council.

The Council is considered an important tool for presidential administrations to use to achieve their domestic, and international economic goals. Robert Rubin said that the purpose for the creation of the Council was to "fix a process problem" and according to Rubin, Clinton said that he believed that he needed to find "some process instrument" which would be able to perform the role and function necessary to advance the president's agenda, and allow agencies to deliberate, coordinate, and solve matters of economic importance. Rubin states another reason Clinton established the Council was "“integrate domestic and international economic policy and. . .integrate international economic policy and so-called foreign policy.” Instead of having two domestic and international domestic staff, the council would blend the two together.

Structure and membership 
Additional members are added by the President of the United States, however the structure and membership of the National Economic Council, which is similar to that of the National Security Council is as follows:

Directors of the National Economic Council

References

Further reading
Sarah Rosen Wartell. "The White House: National Economic Council." In Change for America: A Progressive Blueprint for the 44th President.  Edited by Mark Green and Michele Jolin, pp. 15–22. Washington: The Center for American Progress Action Fund, 2008.

External links
National Economic Council (Archive)

Economy of the United States
Executive Office of the President of the United States
United States economic policy
United States national commissions